Rumpelmayer's was a café and ice cream parlor (in fact, it has been described as a landmark ice cream parlor) in the Hotel St. Moritz and part of a chain started by Anton Rumpelmayer.  It was popular for children's birthday parties, Sunday breakfasts, and afternoon teas.  The Art Deco restaurant was designed by Winold Reiss and offered views of Central Park. 

The pink walls had Egyptian-style mosaics and the room was decorated with stuffed animals. They were known for their hot fudge sundaes and hot cocoa, which was served in silver pots and considered “ benchmark hot cocoa.”

Rumplemayer's opened when the St. Moritz opened in 1930 and closed when the hotel closed in April 1998.

References

Defunct restaurants in New York City
Restaurants in Manhattan
Ice cream parlors in the United States
Coffeehouses and cafés in the United States